Constitutional Assembly elections were held in Nicaragua on 6 February 1972.

Results

References

Bibliography
Elections in the Americas A Data Handbook Volume 1. North America, Central America, and the Caribbean. Edited by Dieter Nohlen. 2005.
Pezzullo, Lawrence and Ralph Pezzullo. At the fall of Somoza. Pittsburgh: University of Pittsburgh Press. 1993.
Political handbook of the world 1973. New York, 1974. 
Schooley, Helen. Conflict in Central America. Harlow: Longman. 1987.

Elections in Nicaragua
1972 in Nicaragua
Nicaragua
Election and referendum articles with incomplete results